Tayside Aviation is a flight training and aircraft service company based at Dundee Airport in Dundee, Scotland.

Tayside Aviation was established in 1968 with one aircraft at Riverside Airstrip in Dundee, built on land reclaimed from the River Tay. The Riverside Airstrip evolved into the current Dundee Airport.

Since then it has grown to a company that operates over 15 aircraft over two sites at Dundee and Fife. The company is the largest light aircraft training organisation in Scotland and operates an aircraft engineering facility at Dundee Airport.

The company offers both private and commercial pilot training, and is the sole contractor to the RAF Air Cadet Organisation to provide cadets with Light Aircraft Flying Scholarships to achieve solo standard. The Hong Kong region of GAPAN contract their PPL scholarships to Tayside Aviation.

Tayside Aviation has four nominated charities that it supports regularly.

In 2015, Tayside Aviation launched the BSc (Hons) Professional Aviation Pilot Practice Degree. In association with Middlesex University, Aviation Skills Partnership and Loganair. The Degree will be incorporated with the standard ATPL syllabus. Currently, four courses are enrolled on the programme with a total of 24 students. October 2016 will see another course enroll. Graduates are expected to move onto aircraft such as the Saab 340, Saab 2000, Dornier 328 after pilot training or, after a period as a Flight Instructor at Tayside.

Fleet 
Tayside Aviation's fleet includes the following aircraft:

References 

About Us. Tayside Aviation. Retrieved on 2008-02-23.

External links 

Tayside Aviation website
Bsc Professional Aviation Pilot Practice Degree
RAF Cadet Contract With Tayside Aviation 
Aviation Skills Partnership
Loganair

Aviation in Scotland
Aviation schools in the United Kingdom
British companies established in 1968
Organisations based in Dundee
Transport in Dundee
1968 establishments in Scotland